Nefertkau I was a 4th Dynasty princess of ancient Egypt. She was the eldest daughter of King Sneferu and hence a half-sister to King Khufu. She was the mother of Nefermaat II and the grandmother of Sneferukhaf.

Nefertkau is explicitly said to be a daughter of Sneferu in inscriptions from the tomb of her son and her grandson. Kurt Heinrich Sethe argued from the inscription in Nefermaat’s tomb that Nefertkau had married her own father and that Nefermaat was Sneferu’s son. George Andrew Reisner argued against this theory and suggested that Nefertkau may have married Khufu. He does allow for the possibility that Nefertkau married a noble man whose name was lost.

Nefertkau may have buried in mastaba G 7050 at Giza. The tomb is not inscribed however so that the ownership is somewhat conjectural.

References 

27th-century BC women
26th-century BC women
Princesses of the Fourth Dynasty of Egypt
Sneferu